The knockout stage of the 2022 AFF Championship were the second and final stage of the 2022 AFF Championship, following the group stage. It was took place from 6 to 16 January 2023. The top two teams from each group (four in total) advanced to the knockout stage to compete in a two-legged single-elimination tournament beginning with the semi-finals followed by the final. Each tie are played on a home-and-away two-legged basis.

Qualified teams 
The top two highest-placing teams from each of the two groups advanced to the knockout stage. In Group A, Thailand secured the group top spot as the group winner with 10 points after defeating Cambodia by 3–1 in their last match while Indonesia became the group runners-up with similar points but has less goals difference with Thailand. Indonesia defeated Philippines by 2–1 in their last match.

Meanwhile in Group B, Vietnam secured the group top spot with 10 points after defeating Myanmar by 3–0 in their last match while Malaysia became the group runner-up with 9 points after winning 4–1 against Singapore.

Schedule 
The schedule of each round is as follows.

Format 
All matchup ties will be played over two legs. The team that scores more goals on aggregate over the two legs wins the tie. If the aggregate score is level at the end of normal time of the second leg, the team that scores more away goals across both legs advances. If the away goals are still level, extra time is played (away goals do not apply in extra time), and if the same amount of goals are scored by both teams during extra time, the tie is decided by a penalty shoot-out.

Bracket

Semi-finals 
The top two sides of each group advanced to the knockout stages consisting of two-legged semi-finals and finals.

|-

|-

|}

First leg

Indonesia vs Vietnam

Malaysia vs Thailand

Second leg

Vietnam vs Indonesia

Thailand vs Malaysia

Final 

|-

|}

First leg

Second leg

References

External links 
 AFF Mitsubishi Electric Cup Official website
 ASEAN Federation Official website

Knockout stage